Roger Daniel Kitter (20 October 1949 – 3 January 2015) was an English actor, comedian and impressionist, best known for playing Captain Alberto Bertorelli in series 7 of the British sitcom TV series 'Allo 'Allo! after the actor Gavin Richards left the role.  
 
He had previously appeared weekly with Lulu throughout the 10-week run of her 1973 BBC1 series It's Lulu and was a regular on the ITV show Who Do You Do?. With Kaplan Kaye he also recorded a song "Chalk Dust - The Umpire Strikes Back" using the monicker "The Brat". Released on the Hansa label, it entered the UK Singles Chart on 10 July 1982; it reached a peak of number 19, and remained in the chart for 8 weeks. The song was a Top 10 hit in the Netherlands, Belgium and South Africa, and lampooned John McEnroe complaining about line calls in tennis ("The ball's in, everyone can see that the ball's in!"). He also provided the voice of Tommy Cooper in the Lego "Kipper" advertisement.

A Freemason, he was a member of the Chelsea Lodge No. 3098, made up of entertainers. On 25 September 2009 he became Chairman of the Entertainment Artistes' Benevolent Fund.

Kitter died from cancer on 3 January 2015, aged 65.

References

External links 
 

1949 births
2015 deaths
British male television actors
British impressionists (entertainers)
Deaths from cancer in England
Freemasons of the United Grand Lodge of England
Place of birth missing
20th-century British male actors
21st-century British male actors
Pantomime dames
British male comedy actors
British novelty song performers